Adrian Liber (born 9 January 2001) is a Croatian footballer currently playing as a midfielder for Rijeka.

Career statistics

Club

Honours

Rijeka
 Croatian Cup: 2019

Notes

References

2001 births
Living people
People from Zabok
Association football midfielders
Croatian footballers
Croatia youth international footballers
HNK Rijeka players
HNK Orijent players
Croatian Football League players